Proliferating cell nuclear antigen (PCNA) is a DNA clamp that acts as a processivity factor for DNA polymerase δ in eukaryotic cells and is essential for replication. PCNA is a homotrimer and achieves its processivity by encircling the DNA, where it acts as a scaffold to recruit proteins involved in DNA replication, DNA repair, chromatin remodeling and epigenetics.

Many proteins interact with PCNA via the two known PCNA-interacting motifs PCNA-interacting peptide (PIP) box and AlkB homologue 2 PCNA interacting motif (APIM). Proteins binding to PCNA via the PIP-box are mainly involved in DNA replication whereas proteins binding to PCNA via APIM are mainly important in the context of genotoxic stress.

Function 

The protein encoded by this gene is found in the nucleus and is a cofactor of DNA polymerase delta. The encoded protein acts as a homotrimer and helps increase the processivity of leading strand synthesis during DNA replication. In response to DNA damage, this protein is ubiquitinated and is involved in the RAD6-dependent DNA repair pathway. Two transcript variants encoding the same protein have been found for this gene. Pseudogenes of this gene have been described on chromosome 4 and on the X chromosome.

PCNA is also found in archaea, as a processivity factor of polD, the single multi-functional DNA polymerase in this domain of life.

Expression in the nucleus during DNA synthesis 
PCNA was originally identified as an antigen that is expressed in the nuclei of cells during the DNA synthesis phase of the cell cycle. Part of the protein was sequenced and that sequence was used to allow isolation of a cDNA clone. PCNA helps hold DNA polymerase delta (Pol δ) to DNA. PCNA is clamped to DNA through the action of replication factor C (RFC), which is a heteropentameric member of the AAA+ class of ATPases. Expression of PCNA is under the control of E2F transcription factor-containing complexes.

Role in DNA repair 
Since DNA polymerase epsilon is involved in resynthesis of excised damaged DNA strands during DNA repair, PCNA is important for both DNA synthesis and DNA repair.

PCNA is also involved in the DNA damage tolerance pathway known as post-replication repair (PRR). In PRR, there are two sub-pathways:
(1) a translesion pathway, which is carried out by specialised DNA polymerases that are able to incorporate damaged DNA bases into their active sites (unlike the normal replicative polymerase, which stall), and hence bypass the damage, and
(2) a proposed "template switch" pathway that is thought to involve damage bypass by recruitment of the homologous recombination machinery.
PCNA is pivotal to the activation of these pathways and the choice as to which pathway is utilised by the cell. PCNA becomes post-translationally modified by ubiquitin. Mono-ubiquitin of lysine number 164 on PCNA activates the translesion synthesis pathway. Extension of this mono-ubiquitin by a non-canonical lysine-63-linked poly-ubiquitin chain on PCNA is thought to activate the template switch pathway. Furthermore, sumoylation (by small ubiquitin-like modifier, SUMO) of PCNA lysine-164 (and to a lesser extent, lysine-127) inhibits the template switch pathway. This antagonistic effect occurs because sumoylated PCNA recruits a DNA helicase called Srs2, which has a role in disrupting Rad51 nucleoprotein filaments fundamental for initiation of homologous recombination.

PCNA-binding proteins 
PCNA interacts with many proteins.

Apoptotic factors
ATPases
Base excision repair enzymes 
Cell-cycle regulators
Chromatin remodeling factor
Clamp loader
Cohesin
DNA ligase 
DNA methyltransferase
DNA polymerases
E2 SUMO-conjugating enzyme
E3 ubiquitin ligases
Flap endonuclease
Helicases
Histone acetyltransferase
Histone chaperone 
Histone deacetylase 
Mismatch repair enzymes
NKp44 receptor 
Nucleotide excision repair enzyme
Poly ADP ribose polymerase
Procaspases 
Protein kinases
Licensing factor
TCP protein domain 
Topoisomerase

Interactions 

PCNA has been shown to interact with:

 Annexin A2,
 CAF-1,
 CDC25C,
 CHTF18,
 Cyclin D1,
 Cyclin O,
 Cyclin-dependent kinase 4,
 Cyclin-dependent kinase inhibitor 1C,
 DNMT1,
 EP300,
 Establishment of Sister Chromatid Cohesion 2, 
 Flap structure-specific endonuclease 1,
 GADD45A,
 GADD45G,
 HDAC1,
 HUS1,
 ING1,
 KCTD13,
 KIAA0101,
 Ku70,
 Ku80,
 MCL1,
 MSH3,
 MSH6,
 MUTYH,
 P21,
 POLD2,
 POLD3,
 POLDIP2,
 POLH,
 POLL,
 RFC1,
 RFC2,
 RFC3,
 RFC4,
 RFC5,
 Ubiquitin C
 Werner syndrome ATP-dependent helicase,
 XRCC1,  and
 Y box binding protein 1.

Proteins interacting with PCNA via APIM include human AlkB homologue 2, TFIIS-L, TFII-I, Rad51B, XPA, ZRANB3, and FBH1.

Uses 
Antibodies against proliferating cell nuclear antigen (PCNA) or monoclonal antibody termed Ki-67 can be used for grading of different neoplasms, e.g. astrocytoma. They can be of diagnostic and prognostic value.  Imaging of the nuclear distribution of PCNA (via antibody labeling) can be used to distinguish between early, mid and late S phase of the cell cycle.  However, an important limitation of antibodies is that cells need to be fixed leading to potential artifacts.

On the other hand, the study of the dynamics of replication and repair in living cells can be done introducing translational fusions of PCNA. To eliminate the need for transfection and bypass the problem of difficult to transfect and/or short lived cells, cell permeable replication and/or repair markers can be used. These peptides offer the distinct advantage that can be used in situ in living tissue and even distinguish cells undergoing replication from cells undergoing repair.

PCNA is a potential therapeutic target in cancer therapy.

See also 
 Ki-67 – cellular marker for proliferation
 Transcription

References

Further reading

External links 
 
 
 
 
 

Cell cycle regulators
DNA replication
DNA repair
Proteins